Do No Harm may refer to:

Medicine 
 First, do no harm, or, in Latin, primum non nocere, a medical injunction

Media 
 ...First Do No Harm, a 1997 television film starring Meryl Streep
 Do No Harm (TV series), a 2013 TV series on NBC
 "Do No Harm" (Burn Notice), and episode of Burn Notice
 "Do No Harm" (Lost), an episode of Lost
 "Do No Harm", an episode of Strong Medicine
 "Do No Harm", an episode of Lie to Me
 "Do No Harm", an episode of Adventure Time

Literature 
 Do No Harm: Stories of Life, Death and Brain Surgery, a 2014 book by Henry Marsh

Human Rights 
 Harm principle, a philosophical concept
 "Do No Harm" (HR report on Bahrain), a 2011 report by Physicians for Human Rights

See also 
 Ahimsa